Haynes Academy for Advanced Studies is a Magnet School in the Jefferson Parish School District in Metairie, Louisiana. Haynes has been designated a Five Star School by the Louisiana State education agency. The Haynes Academy is named after Vernon C. Haynes, a former principal of the school. Offering a vast majority of clubs and Honor Societies, Haynes educates the next generations. Haynes is a nationally acclaimed school in Academic Games, led by their head coach, Mrs. Gamble, creating a dynasty that has lasted for nearly a decade. Haynes is the current Louisiana Quiz Bowl State Champion, Mission Ignition champions, and Louisiana Key Club Lieutenant Governor. Through its diverse curriculum, Haynes provides students with the keys to their education, setting up their future careers. Recently, Haynes was recognized as a trailblazer in securing new software and IBCs in the Jefferson Parish.

History
Haynes Academy for Advanced Studies was established in 1909 by the Jefferson Parish School Board and named Metairie Ridge School. By 1912, the wood-framed, one-room schoolhouse had grown to an enrollment of 54. By 1929, grades 1 through 12 had been established and the school was renamed Metairie High School. After East Jefferson High opened in 1955, it was converted to a junior high school and Vernon C. Haynes became the principal.

During the 1968–69 school year, the two-story school building, which had been used for 44 years, was torn down and replaced with the present single-story building. In 1969, it became Metairie Middle School. 

On November 22, 1974, the school's name was once again changed to the Vernon C. Haynes Middle School in honor of the former principal. 

Haynes Middle School became Haynes Middle School for Advanced People in October 2004, and then became Haynes Academy for Advanced Studies in May 2006 after adding one high school grade each year. The class of 2010 was the first class to graduate from Haynes Academy for Advanced Studies.

Though the school's name has changed many times throughout the years, the mascot has stayed the same. The Haynes Academy for Advanced Studies’ mascot is the Yellow Jacket (named Felix and Felicity).

Academics
Haynes is a Magnet School that focuses on a particular curriculum set up by the state. Magnet Schools emphasize a particular vocation, such as science, the arts, or mechanics. The admissions process is often very competitive.

The application process occurs in three steps: application submission, the screening phase, and the testing phase. Potential students must first submit a general application online, at any school in the district, or at the Jefferson Parish Public School System offices. Each application will be screened by a panel of three central office administrators. Those who meet the screening criteria will move on to the testing phase of the process. Group paper and pencil tests are administered to potential students. Scores will be reported in the district percentile format and students will be admitted based on those scores.

Haynes offers courses in English, Business, History, Math, PE & ROTC, Science, and Social Studies. Every grade in the school ranks higher in English, Math, Science, and Social Studies than the rest of Jefferson Parish Public Schools and schools in Louisiana in general. The Haynes Academy also offers Special Education programs, as do the other Jefferson Parish School District schools.

Haynes is raked as a top 100 middle and high school in the U.S.

Extracurricular activities

Arts
Haynes Academy has programs for band, music, and drama. The performing arts department has put on productions such as The Little Mermaid and competed in the JPPSS Band Festival. The band and dance teams also March in local parades to engage in Mardi Gras festivities.

Internet safety programs
Haynes Academy has multiple programs for promoting Internet safety including NSTeens, Internet Safety Articles, and SafeKids. NSTeens is an interactive, educational program of the National Center for Missing and Exploited Children. It works to provide age-appropriate resources to help teach children how to be safer online.

SafeKids is one of the oldest sites for Internet safety. The founder and editor, Larry Magid, is the author of the original National Center for Missing and Exploited Children's 1994 brochure, “Child Safety on the Information Highway.”  Haynes also provides students with many Internet safety articles about sites like Facebook and Instagram.

Clubs

Haynes Academy has a multitude of clubs and teams offered to students, including a VEX Robotics team, a National Academic Quiz Tournaments Quiz Bowl team, an Academic Games team, a chess team, a Programming Club, a DECA team, a Youth and Government club that participates in programs such as Model United Nations and LEG, a High School Democrats of America chapter, honor societies, a Science Olympiad team, and a History Bowl team. Haynes also has multiple student organizations representing people of different backgrounds, such as a Muslim Student Association, a NextGen club, and a Bollywood and Bangra Club.

Athletics
Haynes Academy athletics competes in the LHSAA.

Haynes Academy offers boys football, basketball, baseball, wrestling, soccer, track, and cross country along with girls soccer, golf, swimming, track, softball, cheerleading, and basketball.

Championships
The softball team was the runner-up at the state tournament 2021-2022.

Awards and achievements
In January 2011, January 2012, January 2013, January 2014, January 2015, January 2016, January 2017, and January 2018 Haynes Academy won the state “We the People” championship. The “We the People: The Citizen and the Constitution” competition takes the form of simulated congressional hearings where groups of students testify as constitutional experts before panels of judges. The program began in 1987 and, since then, more than 30 million students and 90,000 teachers have participated. Winning the state competition qualified Haynes Academy to participate in the national finals. 

Haynes also holds multiple national titles in Academic Games, led by coach and teacher Eleonora Gamble. Haynes Academic Games holds the most national titles amongst Haynes Academy teams across athletics and academic teams. Multiple National Championships have been won by Haynes.

In 2019, Haynes Chess won 2nd Place in the State Chess Tournament, coached by Coach Ken Ferguson. Haynes Chess also holds multiple state and regional titles dating back multiple years. 

Haynes has 20 National Merit Semifinalists and 19 Finalists for the 2021-2022 School Year, boasting the largest percentage of the graduating class to be National Merit Scholars in the state of Louisiana.

Notable alumni 
 Ellen Degeneres - Personality
 Kevin Kim - Political Aid on various electoral campaigns
 Samuel G. Jones - Saxophonist and chef
 Mahir Rahman - Academic Games 2 Time National Champion
 Haroon Adeel - Bill Clinton Office Assistant

References

Schools in Jefferson Parish, Louisiana
Magnet schools in Louisiana
Educational institutions established in 1909
1909 establishments in Louisiana